The women's 100 metres event at the 2015 African Games was held on 13 and 14 September.

Medalists

Results

Heats
Qualification: First 4 in each heat (Q) and the next 8 fastest (q) advanced to the semifinals.

Wind:Heat 1: +0.8 m/s, Heat 2: +0.2 m/s, Heat 3: -1.0 m/s, Heat 4: +1.8 m/s

Semifinals
Qualification: First 2 in each semifinal (Q) and the next 2 fastest (q) advanced to the final.

Wind:Heat 1: 0.0 m/s, Heat 2: 0.0 m/s, Heat 3: +0.2 m/s

Final
Wind: +0.6 m/s

References

100
2015 in women's athletics
2015